Garu is a small town and is the administrative capital of Garu District, a district in the Upper East Region of north Ghana.

Garu Presbyterian Agricultural Station was established in 1967 by the Presbyterian Church of Ghana (PCG) and is working to improve the living standards of the people in the area.

References

Populated places in the Upper East Region